Augustine Tunde Oladapo (born 27 July 1995) is a Nigerian international footballer who plays for TP Mazembe as a midfielder.

Career
He has played club football for Ifeanyi Ubah, Kwara United, Gombe United and Enyimba. He signed for TP Mazembe in August 2022.

He made his international debut for Nigeria in 2018.

References

1995 births
Living people
Nigerian footballers
Nigeria international footballers
Ifeanyi Ubah F.C. players
Kwara United F.C. players
Gombe United F.C. players
Enyimba F.C. players
Association football midfielders
Nigeria A' international footballers
2018 African Nations Championship players
TP Mazembe players
Nigerian expatriate footballers
Nigerian expatriates in the Democratic Republic of the Congo
Expatriate footballers in the Democratic Republic of the Congo
Linafoot players